Hasan Qadeer (born 1 January 1991) is a Pakistani cricketer. He made his List A debut for Lahore Blues in the 2018–19 Quaid-e-Azam One Day Cup on 30 September 2018. He made his first-class debut for Lahore Blues in the 2018–19 Quaid-e-Azam Trophy on 13 November 2018.

References

External links
 

1991 births
Living people
Pakistani cricketers
Lahore Blues cricketers
Place of birth missing (living people)